Boizenburg is a municipality in the Ludwigslust-Parchim district in Mecklenburg-Western Pomerania, Germany. It is situated on the right bank of the Elbe, 53 km west of Ludwigslust, 25 km northeast of Lüneburg and 50 km east of Hamburg. It is part of the Hamburg Metropolitan Region. Boizenburg's historical old town stretches along the Elbe, has a harbour and offers heritage baroque timberframe and brick buildings.

As per the dictates of the Yalta Conference, Boizenburg was placed just a few kilometers behind the perimeter of the Iron Curtain, otherwise known as the 'Inner German Border'.

History
The German name Boyceneburg was first documented in 1158. The written form changed to Boiceneburg (1171) and then Boizeneburg (1195). The old Low German name for the town and river (Boize) likely stems from the Slavic boj for war (boj-burg = war-castle).

Boizenburg suffered during the Thirty Years' War and its old castle was burnt down by Swedish troops in 1628. In 1709 the church and 160 or more medieval dwellings were incinerated by a fire. The Town Hall was rebuilt in 1712 and the layout of the town was redesigned by Prussian architects sent from Schwerin. They focused on incorporating efficiency of movement with fire-resistance, better sanitation and public space.

During the Napoleonic Wars French troops were quartered in Boizenburg in 1807. A battle was fought with the retreating French army near Boizenburg in 1813.

From 1815 to 1918, Boizenburg was part of the Grand Duchy of Mecklenburg-Schwerin. In 1826 a highway was built, connecting Hamburg, Berlin and subsequently Boizenburg (Highway "B5"). In 1846 the railway between Berlin and Hamburg was constructed. Boizenburg was included with its own train station along this important route.

The shipbuilding yard Lemmsche founded in 1793 became highly industrialized in 1852 and produced many wooden and steel ships. The shipbuilders Thomsen & Co supported the German war effort during World War II. In 1973 the SED reactivated the shipbuilding facilities for the production of smaller inland ships for the USSR. After being privatized in 1989, the yard was declared bankrupt in 1997. Today smaller independent companies are active in the old ship yard.

The Boizenburg Tile Factory established by Hans Duensing in 1903, became Europe's largest tile manufacturer by 1937. After being re-established in 1991, it remains one of the town's main employers. Artistic impressions of the tile work produced in Boizenburg—particularly in the Art Nouveau style - can be found at the Erstes Deutsches Fliesen Museum.

During the communist East German era, residents of Boizenburg were kept under close scrutiny by the Stasi. Many deemed 'politically untrustworthy' had their property confiscated during a state-sponsored terror campaign code-named Operation Vermin (Aktion Ungeziefer).

Sightseeing
One of the advantages of Boizenburg's isolation during the Cold War, is the pristine natural landscape of the Elbe Valley region stretching to the North, South and East. Much of the architecture and infrastructure in the old city remained 'perfectly untouched' during the DDR regime. In addition to significant restoration projects, new installations such as the modern redesign of the harbor and the addition of a topiary garden have greatly added to the Old Town's charm.

Some noteworthy buildings and structures in Ludwigslust-Parchim:

Miscellaneous
Until April 30, 1945 a Nazi concentration camp was established in Boizenburg. The camp was a subcamp to the Neuengamme concentration camp.

On March 12, 1953 a RAF Avro Lincoln heading to Berlin was shot down over Boizenburg by two VVS MiG-15.

Transport 
The town lies on the Berlin-Hamburg railway.

Personalities 
 Hermann Burmeister (1849-1935), jurist, 40 years (1879-1919) mayor of Boizenburg, since 1922 honorary citizen

Sons and daughters 
 Georg Christian Benedict Ackermann (1763–1833), theologian and teacher
 Leonhard Adelt (1881–1945), bookseller, writer and journalist
  (born 1955), chemist
  (1892–1972), Evangelical theologian

References
Official German list of concentration camps Verzeichnis der Konzentrationslager und ihrer Außenkommandos 

Cities and towns in Mecklenburg
Neuengamme concentration camp
Ludwigslust-Parchim
Populated places established in the 13th century
1260s establishments in the Holy Roman Empire
1267 establishments in Europe
Populated riverside places in Germany
Populated places on the Elbe
Grand Duchy of Mecklenburg-Schwerin